Alessandro Ciceri (10 February 1932 – 5 September 1990) was an Italian sport shooter who competed in the 1956 Summer Olympics.

See also
Trap European Champions

References

External links

 
 

1932 births
1990 deaths
Italian male sport shooters
Trap and double trap shooters
Olympic shooters of Italy
Shooters at the 1956 Summer Olympics
Olympic bronze medalists for Italy
Olympic medalists in shooting
Medalists at the 1956 Summer Olympics